Nagazeh-ye Bozorg (also Romanized as Nagāẕeh-ye Bozorg, Naghazehé Bozorg, and Negāzeh-ye Bozorg; also known as Nagāşeh-ye Bozorg, Neqāşeh-ye Bozorg, Neqāzeh Bozorg, and Neqāzeh-ye Bozorg) is a village in Veys Rural District, Veys District, Bavi County, Khuzestan Province, Iran. At the 2006 census, its population was 77, in 11 families.

References 

Populated places in Bavi County